Emmaste-Selja (Selja until 2017) is a village in Hiiumaa Parish, Hiiu County in northwestern Estonia.

The village is first mentioned in 1798 (Selja). Historically, the village was part of Emmaste Manor.

1977-1997 the village was part of Sinima village.

References

Villages in Hiiu County